This is a list of all the seasons played by Leyton Orient Football Club in English football. The club was formed in 1881 as Glyn Cricket Club, and started a football section named Orient Football Club in 1888. Friendly matches were played against local sides until the club was elected into the Clapton & District League for the 1893–94 season.

Leyton Orient is the second oldest football club in London, behind Fulham, and was elected to The Football League for the 1905–06 season. The club has undergone a number of name changes during its history: from Orient to Clapton Orient in 1898; to Leyton Orient in 1946; a reversion to Orient in 1966, then a return to the Leyton Orient name in 1987. The club has reached the top flight of English football once in its history, a single season in Division One in 1962–63 which ended in relegation. Leyton Orient's best performance in the FA Cup was in reaching the semi-final stage in 1977–78.

This list includes the abandoned 1939–40 season and the unofficial Second World War leagues.

Seasons

Key

P = Played
W = Games won
D = Games drawn
L = Games lost
GF = Goals for
GA = Goals against
Pts = Points
Pos = Final position

C&DL = Clapham & District League
LL = London League
SFL = Southern Football League
Div 1 = Football League First Division
Div 2 = Football League Second Division
Div 3 = Football League Third Division
Div3S = Football League Third Division South
Div 4 = Football League Fourth Division
Lge 1 = Football League One
Lge 2 = Football League Two

PR = Preliminary Round
PRP/O = Preliminary Round Play-off
4QR = 4th Qualifying Round
R1 = Round 1
R2 = Round 2
R3 = Round 3
R4 = Round 4
R5 = Round 5
QF = Quarter-finals
SthQF = Southern Quarter-finals
SF = Semi-finals
SthSF = Southern Semi-finals
SthF = Southern Final
R/U = Runners-up
W = Winners

Notes

References

Seasons
 
Leyton Orient